Elton Daniël Kabangu (born 8 February 1998) is a Belgian professional footballer who plays for Willem II.

Club career
Kabangu made his Eerste Divisie debut for FC Eindhoven on in a game against SC Telstar and scored twice after coming off the bench late in the first half of the 2–2 draw.

References

External links
 
 
 Career stats & Profile - Voetbal International

Living people
1998 births
Sportspeople from Kortrijk
Association football forwards
Belgian sportspeople of Democratic Republic of the Congo descent
Belgian footballers
K.A.A. Gent players
FC Eindhoven players
Willem II (football club) players
Belgian expatriate footballers
Expatriate footballers in the Netherlands
Eredivisie players
Eerste Divisie players